The 2004 Atlantic Sun Conference baseball tournament was held at Melching Field at Conrad Park on the campus of Stetson University in DeLand, Florida, from May 26 through 29.   won its first and only tournament championship to earn the Atlantic Sun Conference's automatic bid to the 2004 NCAA Division I baseball tournament.

Seeding
The top six teams (based on conference results) from the conference earn invites to the tournament.

Results

All-Tournament Team
The following players were named to the All-Tournament Team.

Tournament Most Valuable Player
Rusty Brown was named Tournament Most Valuable Player.  Brown was an infielder for Florida Atlantic.

References

Tournament
ASUN Conference Baseball Tournament
Atlantic Sun baseball tournament
Atlantic Sun baseball tournament